Brachystephanus is a genus of plants in the family Acanthaceae. 

It contains the following species (but this list may be incomplete):
 Brachystephanus giganteus Champl.
 Brachystephanus kupeensis Champl.
 Brachystephanus longiflorus Lindau
 Brachystephanus nimbae Heine

 
Acanthaceae genera
Taxonomy articles created by Polbot